Al-Meragh is an archaeological site in Sudan. A buried Napatan settlement was discovered at al-Meragh in 1999-2000. The site consists of two houses with stone pillars and stone door frames. Both buildings are oriented in the same way, which assumes a uniform plan. It appears that the place was inhabited by only one or two generations and was then destroyed by fire, apparently by nomads. The function of this settlement may have involved an administrative center as Nubians colonized in this area.

Further reading 
 Timothy Kendall: Evidence for a Napatan occupation of the Wadi Muqaddam: excavations at al-Meragh in the Bayuda Desert (1999-2000). In: Brigitte Gratien (éditeur): Mélanges offerts à Francis Geus: Égypte - Soudan. imprimerie Université Charles-de-Gaulle - Lille 3, Villeneuve-d'Ascq 2007, S. 197-204.

External links
 Al-Meragh site description 

Archaeological sites in Sudan
Kingdom of Kush